2-C-Methyl--erythritol 4-phosphate (MEP) is an intermediate on the MEP pathway (non-mevalonate pathway) of isoprenoid precursor biosynthesis. It is the first committed metabolite on that pathway on the route to IPP and DMAPP.

See also
 DXP reductoisomerase
 MEP pathway (formerly known as the non-mevalonate pathway)
 Fosmidomycin

References

External links
 

Organophosphates
Monosaccharide derivatives